Gregory River is a rural locality in the Bundaberg Region, Queensland, Australia.

History 
A provisional school named either Gregory Provisional School or Gregory River Provisional School opened on 9 July 1900. In 1905, it was renamed Walluma Provisional School. On 1 January 1909, it became Walluma State School. It closed circa 1914.

Education 
There are no schools in Gregory River. The nearest government primary school is Cordalba State School in neighbouring Cordalba to the south. The nearest government secondary school is Isis District State High School in Childers to the south-east.

References 

Bundaberg Region
Localities in Queensland